The 1924 Alabama Crimson Tide football team (variously "Alabama", "UA" or "Bama") represented the University of Alabama in the 1924 Southern Conference football season. It was the Crimson Tide's 31st overall and 3rd season as a member of the Southern Conference (SoCon). The team was led by head coach Wallace Wade, in his second year, and played their home games at Denny Field in Tuscaloosa, at Rickwood Field in Birmingham and at the Cramton Bowl in Montgomery, Alabama. They finished the season with a record of eight wins and one loss (8–1 overall, 5–0 in the SoCon), as Southern Conference champions and won the Champ Pickens Trophy.

Alabama opened the season with six consecutive shutout victories. After they defeated Union University at Tuscaloosa, the Crimson Tide defeated Furman in their first road contest of the season. Alabama returned to Tuscaloosa where they defeated Mississippi College a week prior to their victory over Sewanee at Birmingham in their SoCon opener. The Crimson Tide continued their dominance with victories at Georgia Tech and in Montgomery against Ole Miss before they allowed their first points of the season in their homecoming victory over Kentucky. Alabama then closed the season with a pair of games at Birmingham where they first lost their lone game against Centre and defeated Georgia in their final game and captured their first SoCon championship.

Before the season
Coach Wade was assisted by Russ Cohen as end coach and Hank Crisp as line coach. The team was captained by Pooley Hubert.  Georgia's then-athletic director Herman Stegeman remarked that with Hubert in the game Alabama had the advantage another team would have by a coach on the field of play. Coach Wade called Hubert "undoubtedly one of the greatest football players of all time."

Schedule

Game summaries

Union

Source:

Alabama opened their 1924 season against Union University at Denny Field, and defeated the Bulldogs 55–0  In a game dominated by the Crimson Tide, touchdowns were scored by Johnny Mack Brown (3), David Rosenfeld (2), Pooley Hubert, Grant Gillis and Andy Cohen.

The victory brought Alabama's all-time record against Union to 3–0.

Furman

Sources:

In what was the first all-time meeting against Furman, Alabama shutout the Purple Hurricane by a 20–0 score in the first road game of the season. After a scoreless first half, Pooley Hubert scored on a one-yard touchdown run late in the third to give the Crimson Tide a 6–0 lead. Alabama then closed the game with a pair of fourth quarter touchdowns. The first came when Hubert ran through the entire Furman team on a fake punt, and the second on a 58-yard Johnny Mack Brown interception return.

The starting lineup was Bruce Jones (left end), Bill Buckler (left tackle), Ben Compton (left guard), Clyde Propst (center), W. S. Oliver (right guard), Jack Langhorne (right tackle), Graham McClintock (right end), Grant Gillis (quarterback), Red Barnes (left halfback), Johnny Mack Brown (right halfback), Pooley Hubert (fullback).

Mississippi College

Sources:

Against Mississippi College, the Crimson Tide defeated the Choctaws 51–0 at Tuscaloosa. In a game dominated by the Crimson Tide, touchdowns were scored by Pooley Hubert (3), Andy Cohen (2), David Rosenfeld (2), and Red Barnes. Rosenfeld had the longest play of the afternoon with his 82-yard touchdown run. The victory brought Alabama's all-time record against Mississippi College to 6–0.

The starting lineup was Ben Hudson (left end), Bill Buckler (left tackle), Bruce Jones (left guard), Clyde Propst (center), Ben Compton (right guard), Jack Langhorne (right tackle), Graham McClintock (right end), Grant Gillis (quarterback), Red Barnes (left halfback), Johnny Mack Brown (right halfback), Pooley Hubert (fullback).

Sewanee

Source:

In what was their first game in conference play, Alabama defeated the Sewanee Tigers 14–0 at Rickwood Field. David Rosenfeld gave the Crimson Tide a 7–0 lead after his 56-yard run in the first quarter. Pooley Hubert then scored what would be the final points of the game on a four-yard touchdown run that made the final score 14–0.

Of note in the second quarter, the Sewanee team got into a fight with the Alabama student section in the second quarter. The victory brought Alabama's all-time record against Sewanee to 7–10–3.

The starting lineup was Red Barnes (left end), Bill Buckler (left tackle), Ben Compton (left guard), Clyde Propst (center), Bruce Jones (right guard), Jack Langhorne (right tackle), Graham McClintock (right end), Grant Gillis (quarterback), David Rosenfeld (left halfback), Hulet Whitaker (right halfback), Pooley Hubert (fullback).

Georgia Tech

Sources:

At Atlanta, Alabama defeated the Georgia Tech Golden Tornado for the first time since their 1914 season with a 14–0 victory. After a scoreless first quarter, the Crimson Tide took a 7–0 lead on a double pass from Grant Gillis to Johnny Mack Brown. Tech drove the ball to the Alabama six yard line in the third with a chance to tie the game up but was stopped on 4th and 1.

A short David Rosenfeld touchdown run in the fourth quarter clinched the Alabama victory. The victory improved Alabama's all-time record against Georgia Tech to 3–7–2.

The starting lineup was Herschel Caldwell (left end), Bill Buckler (left tackle), Jack Langhorne (left guard), Clyde Propst (center), Bruce Jones (right guard), Pete Camp (right tackle), Graham McClintock (right end), Grant Gillis (quarterback), Hulet Whitaker (left halfback), Johnny Mack Brown (right halfback), Pooley Hubert (fullback).

Ole Miss

Source:

At Montgomery Alabama defeated the Ole Miss Rebels 61–0 at the Cramton Bowl. The Crimson Tide scored nine touchdowns and had 26 first downs to Ole Miss's one in the contest. Touchdowns were scored by James Johnson (3), Johnny Mack Brown (2), David Rosenfeld, Red Barnes, Herschel Caldwell and Andy Cohen. The victory brought Alabama's all-time record against Ole Miss to 11–2–1.

The starting lineup was Herschel Caldwell (left end), Claude Perry (left tackle), Bruce Jones (left guard), Clyde Propst (center), Ben Compton (right guard), Pete Camp (right tackle), Graham McClintock (right end), Grant Gillis (quarterback), Hulet Whitaker (left halfback), Johnny Mack Brown (right halfback), Pooley Hubert (fullback).

Kentucky

Sources:

For the second consecutive year Alabama played Kentucky for homecoming, and for the second consecutive year the Crimson Tide defeated the Wildcats, this time by a score of 42–7. Alabama took a 7–0 lead in the first quarter on a short Pooley Hubert touchdown run, and then they extended to 14–0 at halftime behind a Herschel Caldwell touchdown reception from Grant Gillis in the second. Early in the third quarter, Charles Hughes scored Kentucky's lone points with his 97-yard interception return for a touchdown. This also marked the first points scored against the Crimson Tide for the season as they had shut out their previous six opponents.

Johnny Mack Brown scored on the next play when he returned the kickoff 101 yards for a touchdown and extended the Alabama lead to 21–7. Hubert then scored the next pair of touchdowns for the Crimson Tide on runs in the third and fourth quarters. David Rosenfeld then made the final score 42–7 with his 76-yard punt return late in the fourth quarter. The victory improved Alabama's all-time record against Kentucky to 3–1.

The starting lineup was Herschel Caldwell (left end), Bill Buckner (left tackle), Jack Langhorne (left guard), Clyde Propst (center), Bruce Jones (right guard), Pete Camp (right tackle), Graham McClintock (right end), Grant Gillis (quarterback), Johnny Mack Brown (left halfback), Hulet Whitaker (right halfback), Pooley Hubert (fullback).

Centre

Sources:

Against Centre College, Alabama lost their only game of the season to the Praying Colonels at Rickwood Field by a 17–0 score. After a scoreless first quarter, Centre took a 7–0 lead into halftime after Herb Covington scored on a short run. Cliff Lemon then extended their lead with his 32-yard field goal in the third quarter, and then made the final score 17–0 with his 20-yard touchdown reception from Covington in the fourth quarter.

Alabama would not lose another game until their loss against Georgia Tech in their 1927 season. The loss brought Alabama's all-time record against Centre to 2–1.

The starting lineup was Herschel Caldwell (left end), Jack Langhorne (left tackle), Bill Buckler (left guard), Clyde Propst (center), Bruce Jones (right guard), Tom Camp (right tackle), Graham McClintock (right end), Grant Gillis (quarterback), David Rosenfeld (left halfback), Hulet Whitaker (right halfback), Pooley Hubert (fullback).

Georgia

Sources:

In their final game of the season the Crimson Tide defeated the Georgia Bulldogs 33–0, and secured their first SoCon football championship. Alabama took a 6–0 lead in the first quarter behind field goals of 33 and 35 yards by Ben Compton. The lead was extended to 12–0 at halftime after Pooley Hubert threw a 15-yard touchdown pass to Herschel Caldwell in the second quarter.

After a scoreless third, Alabama closed the game with a trio of fourth quarter touchdowns. The first came on a Hubert pass to Ben Hudson, the second on a 65-yard Johnny Mack Brown interception return, and the third on a Hubert run. The victory improved Alabama's all-time record against Georgia to 7–9–3.

The starting lineup was Bem Hudson (left end), Ben Compton (left tackle), W. S. Oliver (left guard), Clyde Propst (center), Jack Langhorne (right guard), Pete Camp (right tackle), Graham McClintock (right end), Pooley Hubert (quarterback), Johnny Mack Brown (left halfback), Red Barnes (right halfback), Herschel Caldwell (fullback).

Postseason

The Tide started with season with seven consecutive victories, and was only really challenged once. Alabama was awarded the Champ Pickens Trophy. "This was the beginning of the Crimson reign." "Wade...had developed football players who tackled more smartly than any football players had hitherto tackled in the South and in blocking they were in a class by themselves."

Personnel

Depth chart
The following chart provides a visual depiction of Alabama's lineup during the 1923 season with games started at the position reflected in parenthesis. The chart mimics a single wing on offense.

Varsity letter winners

Line

Backfield

Coaching staff

References
General

 

Specific

Alabama
Alabama Crimson Tide football seasons
Southern Conference football champion seasons
Alabama Crimson Tide football